The Hervormd Gereformeerde Staatspartij (in English: Reformed Reformed State Party (see below), HGS) was a Dutch orthodox Protestant political party during the interbellum. For its orthodox political ideals and its refusal to cooperate in any cabinet, the party is called a testimonial party.

Party history
The HGS was founded in 1921 as split from the Protestant Christian Historical Union. The party's support for female suffrage and the Catholic/Protestant coalition were important reasons for the split. The direct reasons was a series of demonstrations held in Amsterdam by orthodox Protestants, who opposed the lifting of the ban on Catholic processions in the Northern provinces. The movement had called itself the June Movement, a reference to the April movement which was crucial in the formation of the first Protestant party, the ARP. A driving force in the split had been the minister Casper Lingbeek. The split is very similar to the split of the orthodox Protestant SGP from the mainstream Protestant ARP.

The party contested the Dutch general election of 1925 winning one seat, it was taken by Lingbeek. The elections were turbulent because the cabinet led by Charles Ruijs de Beerenbrouck had fallen over the Dutch representation at the Holy See an issue that had divided Catholics and Protestants. In the 1929 election the party retained its one seat. In 1931 Lingbeek stood down, in favour of Peereboom. In the 1933 elections Lingbeek was asked to return to parliament by his supporters. In the 1930s the party was methodically isolated by other Protestant parties. The appeal of the Protestant ARP's strongman Hendrikus Colijn, who promised to end the economic crisis, on the party's electorate as well as the appeal of the NSB on several prominent party members, caused the downfall of the party. The party also lacked a strong pillarized organization around it.  It was unable to win a seat in the 1937 elections.

After the war former members of the HGS founded the Protestant Union, with several former members of the CHU. It entered in the 1946 elections but was unable to win any seats. It continued to exist as a study club until the 1980s

Name
The party's name, Hervormd Gereformeerde Staatspartij, is rather difficult to translate because it refers to two kinds of Protestantism, the mainstream Dutch Reformed Church (Nederlands Hervormde Kerk), hence Hervormd and Reformed Churches in the Netherlands (Gereformeerde Kerken Nederland), hence Gereformeerd. It sought to unite these two religions in one national Protestant church. The party was called staatspartij because it represented the general interest and not some partial interest. The acronym was taken by the party's founders to also mean "Hear Gods Voice" (Hoor Gods Stem).

Ideology & issues

The HGS was an orthodox Protestant party with a strong nationalist tendency, based on two core ideas: virulent anti-Catholicism and theocracy.

The party wanted to, in their view, return the Netherlands to its original form: a Protestant nation, based on principles of the bible. It identified heavily with the Geuzen, the Protestant resistance movement which was crucial in Eighty Years' War against the Catholic Spaniards. The HGS feared the emancipation of the Dutch Catholics, because it saw Catholicism as a false religion and feared that the Catholics might try to take over the country. The party saw the doleantie in which the Dutch Reformed Church was split as a historic mistake as it weakened the power of the Protestant part of the population.

In its manifesto of principles it explained their view on the ten commandments. The first commandment ("Thou shalt have no other gods before Me...") was interpreted as a rejection of the false gods of Plutos (capitalism), Demos (democracy) and Ochlos (socialism). The party rejected both socialism and strikes as a political tool, and capitalism and exploitation. Both in their view were in contradiction with the eight commandment ("Thou shalt not steal").

Practically this meant that the party was opposed to government control of society, like compulsory voting, compulsory vaccination, and social security.

Representation
This table show the HGS's results of the HGS in elections to the House of Representatives and Senate, as well as the party's political leadership: the fractievoorzitter, is the chair of the parliamentary party and the lijsttrekker is the party's top candidate in the general election, these posts are normally taken by the party's leader.

Municipal and provincial government
The party also held one to two seats provincial legislature of South Holland and local legislatures in cities like the Hague, Arnhem and Vianen.

Electorate
Support for the HGS was religiously based. Many of the party's supporters came from was supported by the Confessional Union, the orthodox wing of the Dutch Reformed Church.

Linked organisations
The party's youth movement was called the Jonge Geuzen (Young Beggars). Its bi-weekly periodical was the State and Church.

Relations to other parties
The HGS was methodically isolated, and isolated itself. Because of its anti-Catholicism it was opposed to the Catholic RKSP. It was also opposed to the liberalism of the LSP and the socialism of the SDAP. The CHU and to a lesser extent the ARP were reminded by the party of their original ideals, they rejected the ideological orthodoxy of the HGS however.

International comparison
Internationally the party is comparable to some of the extreme organizations of the American Christian right.

1921 establishments in the Netherlands
Anti-Catholic organizations
Anti-Catholicism
Confessional parties in the Netherlands
Defunct Christian political parties
Defunct political parties in the Netherlands
Political parties disestablished in 1946
Political parties established in 1921
Protestant political parties